Buddleja simplex is probably extinct, as no record of it has been made for nearly 200 years. It was a species endemic to Saltillo in Mexico, described and named by Kraenzlin in 1912.

Description
Buddleja simplex is a small shrub, the young branches subquadrangular with adpressed tomentum. The small, membranaceous oblong-elliptic or oblong-lanceolate leaves have 0.5 – 1.5 cm petioles, and are 2 – 4 cm long by 0.5 – 1.2 cm wide, tomentulose above, tomentose below. The bracted inflorescences are 5 – 10 cm long, comprising 8 – 10 pairs of sessile or pedunculate heads < 0.6 cm in diameter.

The species is considered very close to B. sessiliflora, the latter having marginally larger flower heads and longer fruits.

References

simplex
Flora of Mexico
Flora of Central America
Taxa named by Friedrich Wilhelm Ludwig Kraenzlin